Bordertown railway station is located on the Adelaide to Wolseley line in Bordertown.

History
The railway arrived in Bordertown on 22 September 1881 when the Kingston SE to Narracoorte line was extended north. It was connected via rail to Adelaide in 1886 with the arrival of the Adelaide-Wolseley line. The current station was built in 1914.

The railway station was listed on the South Australian Heritage Register on 22 September 1994.

Services
The only passenger rail service which stops at the station is Journey Beyond's twice weekly Overland service operating between Adelaide and Melbourne.

References

Railway stations in South Australia
Railway stations in Australia opened in 1914
South Australian Heritage Register